The X Factor 2013 may refer to:

X Factor (Albania season 3)
The X Factor (Australia season 5)
X-Faktor (series 4), Hungary
X Factor Indonesia (season 1)
X Factor (Italy series 7)
The X Factor (New Zealand series 1)
X Factor (Poland series 3)
X Factor (Romania season 3)
X Factor Adria (series 1), Serbia
The X Factor (UK series 10)
The X Factor (U.S. season 3)